Hannah B. Higgins (born 1964) is an American writer and academic living in Chicago, Illinois. Higgins's research examines various post-conceptual art historical subjects (visual, musical, computational and material) in terms of two philosophically and practically entwined terms: information and sensation. She is a Professor in the Department of Art History and a founding Director of IDEAS, an interdisciplinary arts major, at the University of Illinois at Chicago.

Biography
Higgins is the daughter of the Fluxus artists Dick Higgins and Alison Knowles. She received her B.A. in 1988 from Oberlin College, her M.A. from the University of Chicago in 1990, and graduated with her Ph.D. in 1994 from the University of Chicago. Higgins is married to Joe Reinstein, a digital marketing executive, and has two children: Zoë and Nathalie. Her twin sister, Jessica Higgins, is a New York-based intermedia artist.

Publications
With Douglas Kahn, Higgins co-edited an anthology of computer art (1960-1970) called Mainframe Experimentalism: Early Computing and the Foundations of Digital Art, published in 2012 by University of California Press. 
 The Grid Book, her interdisciplinary history of this defining form in Western culture, was published by MIT Press in early 2009.
 She is the author of a history of the Fluxus movement, Fluxus Experience, published in 2002 by the University of California Press.

References

External links
 Hannah Higgins feature article
 Hannah Higgins interviewed
  Guardian Review
 Jessica Higgins documented by Artist Organized Art
 Hannah Higgins CV
 Fluxus Experience U California Link
 The Grid Book MIT Link
 Mainframe Experimentalism U Cal Press Link

1964 births
American humanities academics
Dalton School alumni
Fluxus
Living people
Oberlin College alumni
University of Chicago alumni
University of Illinois Chicago faculty
American women academics
21st-century American historians
American women historians
Historians from New York (state)
21st-century American women writers